

QI08A Rabbit

QI08AA Inactivated viral vaccines
QI08AA01 Rabbit haemorrhagic disease virus
QI08AA02 Rabbit distemper virus

QI08AB Inactivated bacterial vaccines (including mycoplasma, toxoid and chlamydia)
QI08AB01 Pasteurella + bordetella
QI08AB02 Pasteurella
QI08AB03 Clostridium

QI08AC Inactivated bacterial vaccines and antisera
Empty group

QI08AD Live viral vaccines
QI08AD01 Shope fibroma virus
QI08AD02 Myxomatosis virus

QI08AE Live bacterial vaccines
Empty group

QI08AF Live bacterial and viral vaccines
Empty group

QI08AG Live and inactivated bacterial vaccines
Empty group

QI08AH Live and inactivated viral vaccines
QI08AH01 Live myxomatosis virus + inactivated rabbit haemorrhagic disease virus

QI08AI Live viral and inactivated bacterial vaccines
Empty group

QI08AJ Live and inactivated viral and bacterial vaccines
Empty group

QI08AK Inactivated viral and live bacterial vaccines
Empty group

QI08AL Inactivated viral and inactivated bacterial vaccines
Empty group

QI08AM Antisera, immunoglobulin preparations, and antitoxins
Empty group

QI08AN Live parasitic vaccines
Empty group

QI08AO Inactivated parasitic vaccines
Empty group

QI08AP Live fungal vaccines

QI08AQ01 Trichophyton + microsporum

QI08AQ Inactivated fungal vaccines
Empty group

QI08AR In vivo diagnostic preparations
Empty group

QI08AS Allergens
Empty group

QI08AT Colostrum preparations and substitutes
Empty group

QI08AU Other live vaccines
Empty group

QI08AV Other inactivated vaccines
Empty group

QI08AX Other immunologicals
Empty group

QI08B Hare

Empty group

QI08X Leporidae, others

Empty group

References

I08